Maniaki (Greek: Μανιάκι) may refer to several places in Greece:

 Maniaki, Florina, a village in Florina 
 Maniakoi, a town in Kastoria
 Maniaki, Messenia, a village in Messenia
 Battle of Maniaki, fought 1825 between Egyptian and Greek forces